The Frisii were an ancient Germanic tribe living in the low-lying region between the Rhine–Meuse–Scheldt delta and the River Ems, and the presumed or possible ancestors of the modern-day ethnic Dutch.

The Frisii lived in the coastal area stretching roughly from present-day Bremen to Bruges, including many of the smaller offshore islands. In the 1st century BC, Romans took control of the Rhine delta but Frisii to the north of the river managed to maintain some level of independence. Some or all of the Frisii may have joined into the Frankish and Saxon peoples in late Roman times, but they would retain a separate identity in Roman eyes until at least 296, when they were forcibly resettled as laeti  (i.e., Roman-era serfs) and thereafter disappear from recorded history. Their tentative existence in the 4th century is confirmed by archaeological discovery of a type of earthenware unique to 4th-century Frisia, called terp Tritzum, showing that an unknown number of Frisii were resettled in Flanders and Kent, likely as laeti under the aforementioned Roman coercion.

The lands of the Frisii were largely abandoned by c. 400, probably due to climatic deterioration and flooding caused by sea level rise. They lay empty for one or two centuries, when changing environmental and political conditions made the region habitable again. At that time, settlers that came to be known as 'Frisians' repopulated the coastal regions. Medieval and later accounts of 'Frisians' refer to these 'new Frisians' rather than to the ancient Frisii.

Description
What little is known of the Frisii is provided by a few Roman accounts, most of them military. Pliny the Elder (AD 23–79) said their lands were forest-covered with tall trees growing up to the edge of the lakes.
They lived by agriculture and raising cattle. In the late 1st century the Romans referred to the 'Greater Frisii' as living to the east of the lake Flevo, and the 'Lesser Frisii' to the west of it, so-called for their proportional power, and with the settlements of both stretching along the border of the Rhine to the ocean.

In his Germania Tacitus would describe all the Germanic peoples of the region as having elected kings with limited powers and influential military leaders who led by example rather than by authority. The people lived in spread-out settlements. He specifically noted the weakness of Germanic political hierarchies in reference to the Frisii, when he mentioned the names of two kings of the 1st century Frisii and added that they were kings "as far as the Germans are under kings".

Early Roman accounts of war and raiding do not mention the Frisii as participants, though the neighboring Canninefates (to the west and southwest, in the delta) and Chauci (to the east) are named in that regard. The earliest mention of the Frisii tells of Drusus' 12 BC war against the Rhine Germans and the Chauci. The Romans did not attack them after devastating the lands of the Rhine Germans, but merely passed through their territory and along their coast in order to attack the Chauci. The account says that the Frisii were "won over", suggesting a Roman suzerainty was imposed.

Over the course of time the Frisii would provide Roman auxiliaries through treaty obligations, but the tribe would also appear in its own right in concert with other Germanic tribes, opposing the Romans. Accounts of wars therefore mention the Frisii on both sides of the conflict, though the actions of troops under treaty obligation were separate from the policies of the tribe.

Wars with the Romans
The Frisii were little more than occasional and incidental players in Roman accounts of history, which focus on Roman actions that were of interest to Roman readers. As a consequence, references to them are disjointed and offer little useful information about them.

When Drusus brought Roman forces through Frisii lands in 12 BC and "won them over", he placed a moderate tax on them. However, a later Roman governor raised the requirements and exacted payment, at first decimating the herds of the Frisii, then confiscating their land, and finally taking wives and children into bondage. By AD 28 the Frisii had had enough. They hanged the Roman soldiers collecting the tax and forced the governor to flee to a Roman fort, which they then besieged. The propraetor of Germania Inferior, Lucius Apronius, raised the siege and attacked the Frisii, but was defeated at the Battle of Baduhenna Wood after suffering heavy losses. For whatever reason, the Romans did not seek revenge and the matter was closed. The prestige of the Frisii among the neighboring Germanic tribes was raised considerably.

After their experiences with the predatory Roman governor and Lucius Apronius, the Frisii became disaffected towards Rome. In AD 47, a certain Gannascus of the Canninefates led the Frisii and the Chauci to rebel. They raided along the then-wealthy coast of Gallia Belgica. The Roman military commander, Corbulo, campaigned successfully against the Germanic tribes, For the Chauci and for the Frisii this meant Roman occupation, with the Romans specifying where they must live, with a fort built among them, and forcing a Roman-style senate, magistrates, and constitution upon them.

The Frisii are next mentioned in 54, when they occupied empty, Roman-controlled land near the Rhine, settling into houses and sowing and plowing fields. The Romans attempted to persuade them to leave, and even invited two Frisii kings to Rome to meet Nero, who ordered them to leave. The Frisii refused, whereupon a Roman military force coerced them, killing any who resisted.

In AD 69 the Batavi and other tribes rose against Roman rule in the Revolt of the Batavi, becoming a general uprising by all the Germans in the region, including the Frisii. Things went well for the Germans at first. One of the early leaders, Brinno of the Canninefates tribe, quickly defeated a Roman force of two cohorts and took their camp. The capable Civilis ultimately succeeded to leadership of the Germanic side and inflicted heavy casualties on the Romans, even besieging Roman strongholds such as Vetera. On the sea, a Roman flotilla was captured by a Germanic one. However, the war did not end well for the Germans. Led by Cerialis, the Romans ultimately forced a humiliating peace on the Batavi and stationed a legion on their territory.

In the course of the war, both the Frisii and the Chauci had auxiliaries serving under the Romans. In an assault by Civilis at Colonia Claudia Ara Agrippinensis (at modern Cologne), a cohort of Chauci and Frisii had been trapped and burned.

Final demise of the ancient Frisii
The emperor Constantius Chlorus campaigned successfully against several Germanic peoples during the internecine civil wars that brought him to sole power over the Roman Empire. Among them were the Frisii and Chamavi, who were described in the Panegyrici Latini (Manuscript VIII) as being forced to resettle within Roman territory as laeti (i.e., Roman-era serfs) in c. 296. This is the last reference to the ancient Frisii in the historical record. However, they appear once more, now in the archaeological record. The discovery of a type of earthenware unique to 4th century Frisia known as terp Tritzum shows that an unknown number of them were resettled in Flanders and Kent, likely as laeti under the aforementioned Roman coercion.

If there were any Frisii left in Frisia, they fell victim to the whims of nature, civil strife and piracy. After several hundred years of favorable conditions, the natural environment in the low-lying coastal regions of northwestern Europe began to deteriorate c. 250 AD and gradually worsened over the next 200 years. Rising sea levels and storm surges combined to flood some areas. Many deserted village sites were silted over. The situation was probably aggravated by a shift to a cooler, wetter climate in the region as well as by the introduction of malaria and other epidemic diseases.

In the 3rd and 4th centuries the population of Frisia steadily decreased, and by the 5th century it dropped dramatically. Archaeological surveys indicate that only small pockets of the original population stayed behind (e.g. in the Groningen coastal marshes).
The coastal lands remained largely unpopulated for the next one or two centuries. As soon as conditions improved, Frisia received an influx of new settlers, mostly from regions later characterized as Saxon, and these would eventually be referred to as 'Frisians', though they were not necessarily descended from the ancient Frisii. It is these 'new Frisians' who are largely the ancestors of the medieval and modern Frisians. Their Old Frisian language, however, was more intricately related to Old English spoken by their relatives settling abroad, than to the Old Saxon language spoken by the people staying behind in Germany.

Suggested Roman references

Auxiliaries at Hadrian's Wall
One of the entries of the Notitia Dignitatum reads "Tribunus cohortis primae Frixagorum Vindobala", referring to the office of a tribune of the first cohort of the 'Frixagi', once stationed at Vindobala (at modern Rudchester) on Hadrian's Wall. Efforts have sometimes been made to connect this auxiliary unit with the Frisii by supposing that the original document must have said "Frisiavonum" and a later copyist mistakenly wrote "Frixagorum". Some works make the claim in passing, perhaps citing someone else's claim of a copyist's error as justification.

The Frisiavones

The Frisiavones (or Frisiabones) are mentioned in Pliny the Elder's Natural History (AD 79). They are listed as a people of the islands in and near the Rhine River, as are the Frisii. They also appear as a people of northern Gaul in the chapter on Gallia Belgica, their name given between those of the Sunici and Betasi (not to be confused with the Batavi).

Tangible evidence of the existence of the Frisavones includes several inscriptions found in Britain, from Roman Manchester and from Melandra Castle near modern Glossop in Derbyshire. The Melandra Castle inscription reads "CHO. T. FRISIAVO C. VAL VITALIS", which may be expanded to become "Cohortis Primae Frisiauonum Centurio Valerius Vitalis", which may be translated as "Valerius Vitalis, Centurion of the First Cohort of the Frisiavones".

Suggestions that the Frisiavones were actually the Frisii center on the similarity in names, combined with the Roman classification of 'Lesser Frisii' to the west of the Zuiderzee and 'Greater Frisii' to the east of it (which provides a reason as to why the Frisii might have been known by two different names). However, Pliny's placement of the Frisiavones in northern Gaul is not near the known location of the Frisii, which is acceptable if the Frisavones are a separate people, but not if they are a part of a greater Frisian tribe.

Theodor Mommsen (The Provinces of the Roman Empire from Caesar to Diocletian, 1885) believed that the Germanic tribes of the region consisted of two parts, one having come under Roman influence and the other having remained outside of Roman influence, and he concluded that the Frisiavones were the same people as the Frisii. However, his reasoning parsed the accounts of Tacitus and Pliny selectively: he interpreted the 'Lesser Frisii' and 'Greater Frisii' of Tacitus to refer to the Roman-influenced Frisavones and the non-Roman-influenced Frisii; he considered Pliny's account that mentioned both the Frisiavones and the Frisii to be consistent with the model; and he rejected Pliny's account placing the Frisiavones in northern Gaul, saying that it "is beyond doubt incorrect".

Early medieval 'Frisian' references
The Panegyrici Latini in c. 297 is the last mention of the Frisii by that name. There is no mention of them by any other name for nearly three centuries, when the name re-emerges as 'Frisians'. These later references are all connected to the ascendancy of the Franks under the Merovingians, who referred to the people who had resettled the lands of the ancient Frisii as 'Frisians'. The interpretation of these references to 'Frisians' as references to the ancient Frisii has occasionally been made.

The Byzantine scholar Procopius, writing c. 565 in his Gothic Wars (Bk IV, Ch 20), said that "Brittia" in his time (a different word from his more usual "Bretannia") was occupied by three peoples: Angles, Frisians and Britons. Procopius said that he was relating information from an informant, likely a member of a Frankish delegation to the court at Byzantium, and did not assert the information as fact. Other information that he related included the assertion that there were no horses in Britain, that Hadrian's Wall separated the temperate parts of the island from the uninhabitable parts, and that 'countless people' had attested that Britain was the home of dead souls. His information about Britain, while occasionally useful, is not considered authoritative.

Venantius Fortunatus was a poet to the Frankish Merovingian court and wrote a eulogy to the Merovingian king Chilperic, who had died in 584. A list of peoples who were said to fear Chilperic's power is given and includes the Frisians, as well as the Suebi, Goths, Basques, Danes, Jutes, Saxons, and Britons. The eulogies of this age were intended to praise the high status of the subject, and the sudden reappearance of a list of old tribal names fitted into poetic meters is given little historical value. The context is poetic license rather than historical accuracy.

Coins with the obverse and reverse inscriptions 'AVDVLFVS FRISIA' and 'VICTVRIA AVDVLFO', as well as 'FRISIA' and 'AVDVLFVS' have been found at Escharen, a village in the Dutch province of North Brabant. The stylistic quality suggests that they are of Northern Frankish origin of that era rather than Frisian, besides which a local production using a self-descriptive country name (i.e., 'FRISIA') would be unheard of in that era.

Other medieval 'Frisian' references
Frisia appears in the Old English heroic poem Beowulf, which tells a story of events of the early 6th century. In it, the Geatish king Hygelac is killed while raiding Frisia. It has been noted that Gregory of Tours (c. 538–594) mentioned a Danish king Chlochilaichus who was killed while invading Frankish territory in the early 6th century, suggesting that, in this instance, Beowulf might have a basis in historical facts. However, Gregory was writing little more than fifty years after the events and may have based his story on eyewitness accounts, yet he makes no mention of Frisia or the Frisians. The poem is not considered a rich source of historical facts by Beowulf scholars.

The Historia Brittonum gives a list of 33 ancient cities of Britain, among them 'Cair Peris', its location unspecified. It also contains a reference to the Picts and Orkney and a place 'ultra mare Frenessicum'.  The 'Cair' in 'Cair Peris' is reasonably taken to be Welsh 'Caer' (fort), while 'Peris' is a matter of speculation and conjecture, including the supposition that it is a reference to 'Frisians'. In the context of the Historia, the 'mare Frenessicum' coincides nicely with the Firth of Forth. While the Historia is often useful to scholars, it is also the source of storyline details that have no discernible provenance. It was written more than 500 years after the last unambiguous reference to the ancient Frisii (the Panegyrici Latini in c. 297), and at a time when medieval Frisia and the Frisians were playing a dominant role in North Sea trade.

Notes

References

 
Early Germanic peoples
History of Frisia
History of East Frisia
Ingaevones
Iron Age peoples of Europe